Tins (Tins) is a 2007 film about a journalist who possesses information on uranium sales and is set up by his enemies and sent to prison. Initially the film was planned as a political thriller, but along the way it gained features of action with elements of mysticism and surrealism.

The film is full of vivid pictures of spy and terrorist games in Moscow, modern Gulag in the Far North, gold mines, escape with elite spetsnaz in the pursuit, underground community of permanently high punks, and other quite unusual settings.

The title, which literally translates as "Canned Food", has multiple meanings. One was introduced by Varlam Shalamov in his tales about Gulag, and it was called "calf" – a younger convict accepted to escape team for food, as a walking piece of meat. Another meaning is an interpretation of the film's idea: human beings are "sealed" structures that open only in extreme situations. The third meaning has to do with actual canned meat taken for escape: in the movie these cans play an important part because of their unexpected content.

The film was shot in Crimea, Ukraine, where director Egor Konchalovsky had found locations for shootings of Siberian taiga, Ural mines and Moscow streets. He had transformed Inkerman quarries into the Ural prison camp.

Marat Basharov, playing the journalist, had his head shaven for the role, and Sergey Shakurov, playing criminal boss or "thief in the law", had his body tattooed.

Plot
Igor Davidov, an international journalist, possesses dangerous information about high-ranking traitors, including an army general, a State Duma elected official and a well-known nuclear scientist who plan to sell weapons-grade uranium to a Middle East country.

The traitors realise that someone has leaked their plans. They trace the leak to Igor. Events turn nasty. The villainous General Astrahantsev kidnaps the children of loyal Commander Usoltsev, a veteran of the Chechnya war; the nuclear scientist is murdered. The conspirators succeed in framing Usoltsev and Davidov on charges of murder and drug dealing. Both men, who had not previously met, soon find themselves in a remote prison camp.

They try to discover the real reasons for their being in prison. Then with the help of criminals they escape from the camp to seek justice. They face many more tests; not everyone will live through the experience.

External links

Movie Trailer and Screenshots

2007 films
Russian action films
2007 action films
2000s Russian-language films